The Ministry of Water Resources of the People's Republic of China is the department within China's Central People's Government responsible for managing water resources in China.

However, there are several authorities responsible for water management in China. Water pollution is the responsibility of the environmental authorities, but the water itself is managed by the Ministry of Water Resources. Sewage is administered by the Ministry of Housing and Urban-Rural Development, but groundwater falls within the realm of the Ministry of Land and Resources.

Leaders

Current principal leaders 
The Ministry of Water Resources is directed by the Minister of Water Resources.

List of ministers

Organization

Administration
The Ministry of Water Resources consists of following departments and offices:

Other agencies
 River Basin Commissions
 Changjiang Water Resources Commission, located in Wuhan
 Yellow River Conservancy Commission, located in Zhengzhou
 Huai River Water Resources Commission, located in Bengbu
 Hai River Water Resources Commission, located in Tianjin
 Pearl River Water Resources Commission, located in Guangzhou
 Songliao River Water Resources Commission, located in Changchun
 Taihu Basin Authority, located in Shanghai

See also 

 Water resources of China
 Water supply and sanitation in China
 Ministries of the People's Republic of China

References

External links 
 Ministry of Water Resources Official website (English)
 China's environmental governance - 中国与世界，环境危机大家谈

Water Resources
China
Ministries established in 1949
Water resource management in China
Water management authorities